Operation Sophia, formally European Union Naval Force Mediterranean (EU NAVFOR Med), was a military operation of the European Union that was established as a consequence of the April 2015 Libya migrant shipwrecks with the aim of neutralising established refugee smuggling routes in the Mediterranean. The operational headquarters was located in Rome. The EU mandate for the operation ended on March 31, 2020. Operation Irini is the successor operation.

Establishment
A European Maritime Force operation to combat people smuggling and prevent loss of life in the Mediterranean stemmed from discussions in the European Council on 20 and 23 April 2015, culminating in the issuing of a Council decision on 18 May 2015 to establish a "European Union military operation in the Southern Central Mediterranean". Rear Admiral Enrico Credendino of the Italian Navy was appointed as operation commander. The Political and Security Committee appointed Italian Rear-Admiral Andrea 
Gueglio as force commander on 17 June 2015, and on 22 June 2015 the European Council approved the launching of EUNAVFOR Med, to take effect that day.

Name
At the suggestion of the attending medical personnel, the child was named Sophia. This was a name associated with German naval ships named Schleswig-Holstein, as the earlier destroyer  had used the radio call sign "Sophie X". This was itself a reference to the early battleship , which had been dedicated to Princess Louise Sophie of Schleswig-Holstein-Sonderburg-Augustenburg, as have later ships of the name. EUNAVFORMED was subsequently renamed "Operation Sophia", after the baby born aboard Schleswig-Holstein.

Operation

The operation aims to undertake systematic efforts to identify, capture and dispose of vessels as well as enabling assets used or suspected of being used by migrant smugglers or traffickers. The Juncker Commission, in particular the High Representative of the Union for Foreign Affairs and Security Policy, Federica Mogherini, views this operation as a fundamental contribution to fighting instability in the region and as a way to reduce the loss of lives at sea and increase the security of citizens of the European Union.

Operation Sophia consisted of three phases:
The first phase focused on surveillance and assessment of human smuggling and trafficking networks in the Mediterranean.
The second stage of the operation provided for the search and, if necessary, diversion of suspicious vessels.
The third phase allowed the disposal of vessels and related assets, preferably before use, and to apprehend traffickers and smugglers.

There was a common budget of 11.82 million euros for a 12 months period. In addition, military assets and personnel were provided by the contributing states with the running costs and personnel costs being met on a national basis.

By 2016, more than 13,000 migrants had been rescued from the sea in the course of the operation. On 20 June 2016, the Council of the European Union extended Operation Sophia's mandate reinforcing it by adding  two supporting tasks: training of the Libyan coastguards and navy, and contributing to the implementation of the UN arms embargo on the high seas off the coast of Libya. The length of the Operation could be continuously renewed by the Council. On 25 July 2017, the Council of the European Union again extended Operation Sophia's mandate, while also amending its mandate to: setting up a monitoring mechanism of trainees to ensure the long-term efficiency of the training of the Libyan Coastguard, conducting new surveillance activities and gather information on illegal trafficking of oil exports from Libya in accordance with UNSCR 2146 and 2362; and enhancing the possibilities for sharing information on human trafficking with member states' law enforcement agencies, FRONTEX and EUROPOL.

Assets 

Military contributions from member states to the operation were voluntary at their own expense. However military operations were carried out under the joint command of the EU.

Ships
 Belgium  Leopold I
 Belgium  Louise-Marie
 France  L'Adroit
 France  Aconit
 France  Courbet
 France  Commandant Birot
 France  Commandant Blaison
 France  Commandant Bouan
 France  Commandant Ducuing
 France  Commandant L'Herminier
 France  Enseigne de vaisseau Jacoubet
 France  Premier-Maître L'Her
 France  Lieutenant de vaisseau Le Hénaff
 Germany  Augsburg
 Germany  Karlsruhe
 Germany  Mecklenburg-Vorpommern
 Germany  Schleswig-Holstein
 Germany  Sachsen
 Germany  Ludwigshafen am Rhein
 Germany  Datteln
 Germany  Weilheim
 Germany  Main
 Germany  Mosel
 Germany  Rhein
 Germany  Werra
 Germany  Berlin
 Germany  Frankfurt am Main
 Italy aircraft carrier Cavour
 Italy aircraft carrier Giuseppe Garibaldi
 Italy  San Giorgio
 Italy  San Giusto
 Italy  San Marco 
 Italy  Zeffiro
 Italy FREMM multipurpose frigate Luigi Rizzo
 Italy  Etna
 Netherlands landing platform dock HNLMS Rotterdam
 Republic of Ireland  LÉ Samuel Beckett
 Republic of Ireland  LÉ James Joyce
 Republic of Ireland  LÉ Niamh
 Slovenia  Triglav
 Spain  Canarias
 Spain  Navarra
 Spain  Numancia
 Spain  Reina Sofía
 Spain   Santa María
 Spain  Victoria
 Spain replenishment oiler Cantabria
 Spain  Rayo
 UK Type 45 destroyer 
 UK Type 23 frigate 
 UK Echo-class survey ship 
 UK Echo-class survey ship

Aircraft 
 Belgium Alouette III SA316B helicopter
 France Atlantique 2 maritime patrol aircraft
 France Falcon 50 maritime patrol aircraft
 France AS565 Panther helicopter
 Germany Sea Lynx MK88 helicopter
 Greece Erieye EMB-145H AEW&C command and control aircraft
 Italy Two EH101 helicopters
 Italy T AB 212 ASW helicopter
 Italy SH90 NFH helicopter
 Luxembourg Two SW3 Merlin III maritime surveillance aircraft
 Poland An-28B1R BRYZA maritime surveillance aircraft
 Portugal P-3C Orion maritime patrol aircraft
 Spain  AB 212 helicopter
 Spain SH-60B LAMPS III helicopter
 Spain P-3M Orion maritime patrol aircraft
 Spain CN-235 VIGMA-D4 maritime surveillance aircraft
 UK AW101 (EH 101) Merlin MK 2 helicopter
 UK AW159 Wildcat helicopter
 UK Lynx MK 8 helicopter

Criticism 
The UK's House of Lords has noted in a report that claims this kind of search-and-rescue operation acts as a ‘magnet to migrants and eases the task of smugglers, who would only need their vessels to reach the high seas’ had some validity.

Also the Libyan coastguard has warned that the EU's "Operation Sophia" boosts migrant smuggling, explaining that "People, when they get rescued, call their friends to tell them that there are EU vessels only 20 miles from Libyan waters to save them."

In July 2017, a House of Lords report claimed that the mission had been a failure, as it had managed neither to reduce deaths at sea or disrupt the smuggling network.

Completion
In January 2019, the mission was reduced. In February 2020 a new mission was planned to replace the previous one. On 31 March 2020 the new operation EUNAVFOR MED Operation Irini was launched. In parallel, Operation Sophia permanently ceased its activities.

See also
Environmental migrant
Operation Mare Nostrum
Operation Triton
European migration crisis
Migrant vessels on the Mediterranean Sea

References

Further reading

External links
EUNAVFOR MED
EU agrees on Naval intervention
Factsheet EU navfor med

Sophia
2015 in Italy
2015 in the European Union
European migrant crisis
Naval operations and battles